Rodney John Roberts is an Australian politician from the One Nation party. He was elected to the Legislative Council at the 2019 New South Wales state election.

Before his election, Roberts was a retired detective sergeant with the New South Wales Police Force.

In June 2020, Roberts was elected as assistant president of the New South Wales Legislative Council.

References

Living people
Members of the New South Wales Legislative Council
One Nation members of the Parliament of New South Wales
Pauline Hanson's One Nation politicians
People from Goulburn
Australian police officers
Year of birth missing (living people)
Place of birth missing (living people)
21st-century Australian politicians